Damian Joseph Cowell, also known by his former stage names Humphrey B. Flaubert and DC Root, is an Australian musician who is best known as the frontman for TISM, Root!, The DC3 and Damian Cowell's Disco Machine.

History 
Cowell was born and schooled in Melbourne. His musical output began in the 1970s, when he played in various high school bands. In the early 1980s, he was part of a little-known group called I Can Run, featuring future TISM bandmate Eugene Cester. In December 1982, TISM formed and Cowell adopted the pseudonym "Humphrey B. Flaubert", a play on Australian children's television character Humphrey B. Bear and French author Gustave Flaubert. The group enjoyed underground success in the late 1980s and reached the ARIA top 10 in 1995 with their album Machiavelli and the Four Seasons.

TISM remained largely anonymous throughout their career. Cowell publicly acknowledged his involvement in TISM via the debut single of his band the DC3 – a song titled "I Was The Guy In TISM".

Post-TISM 
Cowell returned to the stage in 2007 under the moniker DC Root, fronting a band called ROOT! During this period Cowell was commissioned by David Walsh to create a soundtrack for his Museum of Old and New Art. The soundtrack was titled Vs Art.

In 2010, ROOT! disbanded and quickly re-formed as The DC3.

Even though much of Cowell's work uses programmed drums, he has played live drums at times, most notably during some songs in TISM's performance at Homebake 1998.

The line-up of his current band, Damian Cowell's Disco Machine, consists of:
 Gordon Blake – guitar
 Andy Hazel – bass
 Gary Walker – drums
 Will Hindmarsh – keyboards
 Emily Jarrett – backing vocals, dancing, violin
 Bek Chapman – backing vocals, dancing
 Tony Martin – additional vocals (recurring guest)

Album discography

TISM 
Great Truckin' Songs of the Renaissance (1988)
Hot Dogma (1990)
Machiavelli and the Four Seasons (1995)
www.tism.wanker.com (1998)
De RigueurMortis (2001)
The White Albun (2004)

ROOT! 
 Root Supposed He Was Out of the Question... (2007)
 Surface Paradise (2009)

Damian Cowell 
 Vs Art (2010)

The DC3 
 The Future Sound of Nostalgia (2011)
 May Contain Traces of Nut (2013)

Damian Cowell's Disco Machine 
 Damian Cowell's Disco Machine (2015)
 Get Yer Dag On! (2017)
Only The Shit You Love (2021)

References 

Living people
Year of birth missing (living people)
Australian alternative rock musicians
Australian rock drummers
Male drummers
Australian male singers
TISM
Musicians from Melbourne